Frodingham railway station was a railway station in Frodingham, Lincolnshire, England. It was open by the Trent, Ancholme, and Grimsby Railway on 1 October 1866 and, like all the others built by that company, had staggered platforms set around the level crossing on the Brigg Road. The first station here was closed in autumn 1886, when a new Frodingham station, built by the Manchester, Sheffield and Lincolnshire Railway, was opened, to the west of the Brigg Road level crossing. This station was suffixed "and Scunthorpe" at some date and was closed in 1928, when the LNER opened a new station which it named Scunthorpe nearer to the town centre.

References

Railway stations in Great Britain opened in 1866
Railway stations in Great Britain closed in 1928
Disused railway stations in the Borough of North Lincolnshire
1866 establishments in England
Former Great Central Railway stations